Six ships of the Royal Navy were named Lucifer:-

 , an 8-gun fireship purchased in frame at Rotherhithe, later renamed HMS Avenger, sold at New York City in 1783; sailed to London, and in 1784 became the mercantile Flora
 , a fireship, mercantile Elizabeth, sold at Deptford in 1784
 , an 8-gun bomb vessel, was built as Spring at Whitby in 1800 and sold to the Royal Navy shortly thereafter. The Royal Navy sold her in 1811. 
 , a paddle gunvessel
 , a 
 , a steamship

Citations and references
Citations

References
 
 
 

Royal Navy ship names